In algebraic geometry, a Deligne–Mumford stack is a stack F such that

Pierre Deligne and David Mumford introduced this notion in 1969 when they proved that moduli spaces of stable curves of fixed arithmetic genus are proper smooth Deligne–Mumford stacks.

If the "étale" is weakened to "smooth", then such a stack is called an algebraic stack (also called an Artin stack, after Michael Artin). An algebraic space is Deligne–Mumford.

A Deligne–Mumford stack admits a presentation by a groupoid; see groupoid scheme.

Examples

Affine Stacks 
Deligne–Mumford stacks are typically constructed by taking the stack quotient of some variety where the stabilizers are finite groups. For example, consider the action of the cyclic group  on  given by

Then the stack quotient  is an affine smooth Deligne–Mumford stack with a non-trivial stabilizer at the origin. If we wish to think about this as a category fibered in groupoids over  then given a scheme  the over category is given by

Weighted Projective Line 
Non-affine examples come up when taking the stack quotient for weighted projective space/varieties. For example, the space  is constructed by the stack quotient  where the -action is given by

Notice that since this quotient is not from a finite group we have to look for points with stabilizers and their respective stabilizer groups.

Stacky curve

Non-Example 
One simple non-example of a Deligne–Mumford stack is  since this has an infinite stabilizer. Stacks of this form are examples of Artin stacks.

References 

Algebraic geometry